Igros Moshe (Israeli/Sephardic pronunciation: Igrot Moshe) is a nine-volume series of halakhic responsa by Rabbi Moshe Feinstein. The first seven volumes were published during Rabbi Feinstein's lifetime, while the remaining two were published posthumously in Jerusalem.

Overview 

Rabbi Moshe Feinstein was recognized during his lifetime as the posek hador, the final decisor in halakhic queries, by much of the world's Orthodox Jewish community, due to his reputation as a talmid chacham with profound knowledge in all areas of Torah. The most difficult questions were often mailed to him. In 1959, a compilation of these questions related to the laws of Orach Chaim were printed in the first volume of Igros Moshe. Later volumes were printed over the next twenty five years, with the publishing of the sixth volume in c. 1985. The remaining two volumes were published posthumously, largely based on manuscripts, with the final printing in 2011. Altogether, the series includes thousands of responsa. In addition, an index titled Yad Moshe was published, listing different ideas and where one can find relating halakhos in the Igros Moshe. His son-in-law, Rabbi David Tendler, translated some of Igros Moshe in a work titled Responsa of Rav Moshe Feinstein: translation and commentary.

"Explosives in his writings" 

On Israeli Prime Minister Menachem Begin's trip to the United States in 1977, he visited Rabbi Feinstein in his apartment in New York. Also present at the meeting were Rabbis Yitzchak Hutner and Yaakov Kamenetsky, also senior Haredi rabbis in the United States. Prior to Begin's arrival at the meeting, his security agents combed Rabbi Feinstein's apartment, searching for  weapons or explosives that may have been planted there to harm the prime minister. Upon seeing this, Rabbi Hutner wittily remarked that if they were searching for explosives, they would "only find them in the writings of our host!" He was referring to the creative and novel ideas and decisions (chidushim) - which are sometimes referred to as bombs - that Rabbi Feinstein had penned in Igros Moshe.

Depth 

On the tenth yahrtzeit (anniversary of death) of Rabbi Feinstein, the mashgiach ruchani of Mesivtha Tifereth Jerusalem, Rabbi Chaim Ganzweig, wrote the following in The Jewish Observer:

Counter work 

A certain individual wrote a work with the intention of refuting Igros Moshe. In the book, he listed his arguments on Rabbi Feinstein and even did so an insulting matter. To have his work published, he brought his manuscript to the same print shop that the Igros Moshe had been printed in. Although the printer, who was Jewish and an admirer of Rabbi Feinstein, did not want to print it, the rabbi instructed him to do so, telling him that printing is his form of income and that he was doing a chesed (kindness) to the writer by helping him achieve his goals.

See also 
List of rulings by Moshe Feinstein

References 

Sifrei Kodesh
Rabbinic legal texts and responsa
Hebrew-language religious books
Moshe Feinstein
Hebrew words and phrases in Jewish law